Egg Harbor City is a city in Atlantic County, in the U.S. state of New Jersey. As of the 2020 United States census, the city's population was 4,396, an increase of 153 (+3.6%) from the 2010 census count of 4,243, which in turn reflected a decline of 302 (−6.6%) from the 4,545 counted in the 2000 census.

The city had the seventh-highest property tax rate in New Jersey, with an equalized rate of 5.044% in 2020, compared to 2.560% in the county as a whole and a statewide average of 2.279%.

History
The area home to Egg Harbor City was initially settled in 1614, when the Dutch vessel Fortuyn landed at the Mullica River. The first settlers named the area "Eyren Haven" after the large number of gull eggs in the area.

In 1854, the Camden and Atlantic Railroad opened. On December 14, 1854, a group of prominent German Americans from Philadelphia, including William and Henry Schmoele and Philip Mathias Wolsieffer, incorporated the "Gloucester Farm and Town Association", which purchased approximately 38,000 acres of woodland north of the railroad to serve as a refuge for those being persecuted in the anti-immigrant violence known as the Know-Nothing movement. The corporation initially planned two cities; a four-square-mile city called "Pomona" closest to the railroad, and another city called "Gloucester" to the north—however, the twin city scheme was dropped in favor of one seven mile-long metropolis called "Egg Harbor City". The development's layout contained an urban "city core" containing 100x150-foot lots bounded by New York Avenue to the west and Baltimore Avenue to the east, while the remainder of the land was divided into separate 20-acre farm parcels. The corporation issued stocks at $300 per share; with each share, stockholders would acquire one residential building lot and one farm parcel. The city was marketed heavily in cities containing large German American populations, including Baltimore, Buffalo, Cleveland, Milwaukee, and St. Louis.

The land was divided and plotted from the railroad north to the Mullica River, west ending at Hanover Avenue, and the easternmost land being the home of the present-day Stockton University. The north-south streets were named for cities with large German populations, while the east-west streets were named for notable Germans, starting with Agassiz Avenue (current-day White Horse Pike to the south, and Zschokke Avenue to the north. The city was planned to include ample public green space; both New York Avenue and Baltimore Avenue were platted with wide medians to accommodate garden plats, Landing Creek would have been dammed to create an artificial lake called "Gloucester Lake", and Egg Harbor City Lake would have been made into a reservoir at the center of a large urban park containing landscaped gardens, an arboretum, and a model farm. The Mullica River was proposed to be made navigable for commercial vessels, and the northern edge of the street grid along the river was to contain canals and wharfs for ships to dock.

Egg Harbor City was officially incorporated as a city by an Act of the New Jersey Legislature on June 14, 1858, from portions of Galloway Township and Mullica Township. The city was reincorporated on February 13, 1868. The city's growth was slowed due to an economic crisis in 1857, and then further during the Civil War. Though the city did not grow to the size as originally proposed, it grew in population steadily in the 1870s, and remained a virtual island of German language and culture in South Jersey for more than 50 years.

Geography 
According to the United States Census Bureau, the city had a total area of 11.42 square miles (29.58 km2), including 10.85 square miles (28.10 km2) of land and 0.57 square miles (1.48 km2) of water (4.99%).

Unincorporated communities, localities and place names located partially or completely within the township include Clarks Landing, Gloucester Furnace and Gloucester Lake.

The city borders the municipalities of Galloway Township and Mullica Township in Atlantic County; and Washington Township in Burlington County.

The city is one of 56 South Jersey municipalities that are included within the New Jersey Pinelands National Reserve, a protected natural area of unique ecology covering , that has been classified as a United States Biosphere Reserve and established by Congress in 1978 as the nation's first National Reserve. All of the city is included in the state-designated Pinelands Area, which includes portions of Atlantic County, along with areas in Burlington, Camden, Cape May, Cumberland, Gloucester and Ocean counties.

Demographics

2010 census

The Census Bureau's 2006–2010 American Community Survey showed that (in 2010 inflation-adjusted dollars) median household income was $52,893 (with a margin of error of +/− $8,582) and the median family income was $67,654 (+/− $6,555). Males had a median income of $35,182 (+/− $7,553) versus $33,994 (+/− $2,214) for females. The per capita income for the borough was $22,294 (+/− $3,702). About 11.3% of families and 20.9% of the population were below the poverty line, including 36.2% of those under age 18 and 12.7% of those age 65 or over.

2000 census
As of the 2000 United States census there were 4,545 people, 1,658 households, and 1,150 families residing in the city. The racial makeup of the city was 66.80% White, 14.19% African American, 0.37% Native American, 1.25% Asian, 0.09% Pacific Islander, 13.49% from other races, and 3.81% from two or more races. Hispanic or Latino people of any race were 24.55% of the population.

There were 1,658 households, out of which 34.2% had children under the age of 18 living with them, 43.7% were married couples living together, 20.3% had a female householder with no husband present, and 30.6% were non-families. 24.9% of all households were made up of individuals, and 10.8% had someone living alone who was 65 years of age or older. The average household size was 2.70 and the average family size was 3.20.

In the city the population was spread out, with 28.3% under the age of 18, 8.5% from 18 to 24, 29.7% from 25 to 44, 19.6% from 45 to 64, and 13.9% who were 65 years of age or older. The median age was 35 years. For every 100 females, there were 93.6 males. For every 100 females age 18 and over, there were 88.9 males.

The median income for a household in the city was $32,956, and the median income for a family was $40,040. Males had a median income of $27,978 versus $23,560 for females. The per capita income for the city was $15,151. About 11.7% of families and 13.1% of the population were below the poverty line, including 13.5% of those under age 18 and 15.5% of those age 65 or over.

Government

Local government
The City of Egg Harbor City is governed within the Faulkner Act (formally known as the Optional Municipal Charter Law) under the Small Municipality Plan, which is available to communities with fewer than 12,000 residents at the time of adoption. The city is one of 15 municipalities (of the 564) statewide that use this form of government. The governing body is comprised of the mayor and the City Council, with all elected at-large in partisan elections as part of the November general election. The mayor is elected to a four-year term of office. The City Council is comprised of nine members, who are elected to three-year terms on a staggered basis in a three-year cycle, with three seats coming up for election each year.

The mayor is the statutory head of the Police department and the city's Chief Executive Officer. The City Council makes local laws, sets an agenda pertaining to the direction that the governments programs and approves budgets for various programs. The City Administrator takes the elected officials programs and sets policy and procedures in order to carry out the day-to-day operations of the municipality. The City Administrator also deals with federal, state, county and neighboring municipal officials to implement the community's needs.

, the Mayor of Egg Harbor City is Democrat Lisa Jiampetti, whose four-year term of office ends on December 31, 2024. Members of the City Council are Council President Joseph Anthony Ricci Jr. (R, 2024), President Pro Tempore Donna M. Heist (D, 2023), Mattia Brown (R, 2022), Steven J. Dash (R, 2022), Kim Hesse (D, 2024), Robin L. Sefton (R, 2024), Karl Timbers (D, 2023), Scott W. Trythall (R, 2022) and Mason Wright Jr. (D, 2023).

Federal, state and county representation
Egg Harbor City is located in the 2nd Congressional District and is part of New Jersey's 2nd state legislative district.

 

Atlantic County is governed by a directly elected county executive and a nine-member Board of County Commissioners, responsible for legislation. The executive serves a four-year term and the commissioners are elected to staggered three-year terms, of which four are elected from the county on an at-large basis and five of the commissioners represent equally populated districts. , Atlantic County's Executive is Republican Dennis Levinson, whose term of office ends December 31, 2023. Members of the Board of County Commissioners are:

Ernest D. Coursey, District 1, including Atlantic City (part), Egg Harbor Township (part), and Pleasantville (D, 2022, Atlantic City), Chair Maureen Kern, District 2, including Atlantic City (part), Egg Harbor Township (part), Linwood, Longport, Margate City, Northfield, Somers Point and Ventnor City (R, 2024, Somers Point), Andrew Parker III, District 3, including Egg Harbor Township (part) and Hamilton Township (part) (R, Egg Harbor Township, 2023), Richard R. Dase, District 4, including Absecon, Brigantine, Galloway Township and Port Republic (R, 2022, Galloway Township), James A. Bertino, District 5, including Buena, Buena Vista Township, Corbin City, Egg Harbor City, Estell Manor, Folsom, Hamilton Township (part), Hammonton, Mullica Township and Weymouth Township (R, 2018, Hammonton), Caren L. Fitzpatrick, At-Large (D, 2023, Linwood), Frank X. Balles, At-Large (R, Pleasantville, 2024) Amy L. Gatto, Freeholder (R, 2022, Hamilton Township) and Vice Chair John W. Risley, At-Large (R, 2023, Egg Harbor Township) 

Atlantic County's constitutional officers are: 
County Clerk Joesph J. Giralo (R, 2026, Hammonton),  
Sheriff Eric Scheffler (D, 2024, Northfield) and 
Surrogate James Curcio (R, 2025, Hammonton).

Politics
As of March 23, 2011, there were a total of 2,562 registered voters in Egg Harbor City, of which 851 (33.2% vs. 30.5% countywide) were registered as Democrats, 617 (24.1% vs. 25.2%) were registered as Republicans and 1,093 (42.7% vs. 44.3%) were registered as Unaffiliated. There was one voter registered to another party. Among the city's 2010 Census population, 60.4% (vs. 58.8% in Atlantic County) were registered to vote, including 80.4% of those ages 18 and over (vs. 76.6% countywide).

In the 2012 presidential election, Democrat Barack Obama received 1,121 votes here (61.0% vs. 57.9% countywide), ahead of Republican Mitt Romney with 674 votes (36.7% vs. 41.1%) and other candidates with 27 votes (1.5% vs. 0.9%), among the 1,838 ballots cast by the city's 2,724 registered voters, for a turnout of 67.5% (vs. 65.8% in Atlantic County). In the 2008 presidential election, Democrat Barack Obama received 1,166 votes here (60.0% vs. 56.5% countywide), ahead of Republican John McCain with 737 votes (38.0% vs. 41.6%) and other candidates with 21 votes (1.1% vs. 1.1%), among the 1,942 ballots cast by the city's 2,969 registered voters, for a turnout of 65.4% (vs. 68.1% in Atlantic County). In the 2004 presidential election, Democrat John Kerry received 975 votes here (54.0% vs. 52.0% countywide), ahead of Republican George W. Bush with 779 votes (43.1% vs. 46.2%) and other candidates with 21 votes (1.2% vs. 0.8%), among the 1,806 ballots cast by the city's 2,626 registered voters, for a turnout of 68.8% (vs. 69.8% in the whole county).

In the 2013 gubernatorial election, Republican Chris Christie received 659 votes here (59.3% vs. 60.0% countywide), ahead of Democrat Barbara Buono with 385 votes (34.7% vs. 34.9%) and other candidates with 16 votes (1.4% vs. 1.3%), among the 1,111 ballots cast by the city's 2,700 registered voters, yielding a 41.1% turnout (vs. 41.5% in the county). In the 2009 gubernatorial election, Democrat Jon Corzine received 576 ballots cast (46.4% vs. 44.5% countywide), ahead of Republican Chris Christie with 520 votes (41.9% vs. 47.7%), Independent Chris Daggett with 58 votes (4.7% vs. 4.8%) and other candidates with 27 votes (2.2% vs. 1.2%), among the 1,242 ballots cast by the city's 2,677 registered voters, yielding a 46.4% turnout (vs. 44.9% in the county).

Education
The Egg Harbor City School District is responsible for the education of public school children in pre-kindergarten through eighth grade. As of the 2021–22 school year, the district, comprised of two schools, had an enrollment of 529 students and 55.0 classroom teachers (on an FTE basis), for a student–teacher ratio of 9.6:1. Schools in the district (with 2021–22 enrollment data from the National Center for Education Statistics) are 
Charles L. Spragg School with 244 students in PreK to Grade 3 and 
Egg Harbor City Community School with 276 students in grades 4 to 8.

Students in ninth through twelfth grades attend Cedar Creek High School, which is located in the northern section of Egg Harbor City and opened to students in September 2010. As of the 2021–22 school year, the high school had an enrollment of 962 students and 77.8 classroom teachers (on an FTE basis), for a student–teacher ratio of 12.4:1. The school is one of three high schools operated as part of the Greater Egg Harbor Regional High School District, which also includes the constituent municipalities of Egg Harbor City, Galloway Township, Hamilton Township and Mullica Township, and participates in sending/receiving relationships with Port Republic and Washington Township (Burlington County). Cedar Creek High School is zoned to serve students from Egg Harbor City, Mullica Township, Port Republic and Washington Township, while students in portions of Galloway and Hamilton townships have the opportunity to attend Cedar Creek through the school of choice program or through attendance in magnet programs offered at Cedar Creek. Seats on the nine-member board are allocated based on the population of the constituent municipalities, with one seat assigned to Egg Harbor City.

Township public school students are also eligible to attend the Atlantic County Institute of Technology in the Mays Landing section of Hamilton Township or the Charter-Tech High School for the Performing Arts, located in Somers Point.

The Pilgrim Academy is a private Christian school. Founded by Dr. Warren Allem in 1971, the school teaches children from kindergarten through 12th grade. The name is taken from John Bunyan's allegorical novel The Pilgrim's Progress.

The Roman Catholic Diocese of Camden formerly maintained the St. Nicholas School in Egg Harbor. It closed in 2007 with a private elementary school opening in its place.

Transportation

Roads and highways

U.S. Route 30 (the White Horse Pike) is the most significant highway passing through Egg Harbor City. Egg Harbor City also features the northern terminus of New Jersey Route 50, which ends at an intersection with US 30 near the center of the city. Major county routes passing through the city include County Route 561 and County Route 563.

The closest limited access road is the Atlantic City Expressway which is two towns away in Hamilton Township while the Garden State Parkway is accessible in neighboring Galloway Township.

Public transportation
The Egg Harbor City station provides NJ Transit service on the Atlantic City Line, connecting 30th Street Station in Philadelphia and the Atlantic City Rail Terminal in Atlantic City.

NJ Transit provides bus service to and from Atlantic City on the 554 route.

The South Jersey Transportation Authority provides shuttle bus service connecting the Egg Harbor City train station with Atlantic City International Airport and Stockton University, as well as other area locations.

Wineries
 Renault Winery
 Sylvin Farms Winery

Notable people

People who were born in, residents of, or otherwise closely associated with Egg Harbor City include:

 Lou Bauer (1898–1979), baseball player who played a single major league game, for the Philadelphia Athletics, as a 19-year-old
 Kathleen Crowley (1929–2017), actress
 John D'Agostino (born 1982), professional poker player
 Louis Kuehnle (1857–1934), entrepreneur and politician who was a pioneer in the early development of Atlantic City
 Frank Morgenweck (1875–1941), basketball player, coach and administrator, member of the Basketball Hall of Fame
 Peace Pilgrim (1908–1981, born Mildred Lisette Norman), peace activist honored in Egg Harbor City by Peace Pilgrim Park and by a birthday celebration each year in July
 Lindsey Petrosh (born 1989), Miss New Jersey 2012
 Tim Reilly, head coach of the Lafayette Leopards baseball team
 Captain Charles Saalmann (1838–1909), infantry captain in the Civil War, Acting Commissary of Subsistence in General William T. Sherman's March to the Sea, vintner

References

External links

 Egg Harbor City website
 Egg Harbor City Historical Society, archived from the original site on October 16, 2016
 The Current of Egg Harbor City – local community newspaper

 
1858 establishments in New Jersey
Cities in Atlantic County, New Jersey
Faulkner Act (small municipality)
German-American culture in New Jersey
German-American history
Populated places established in 1858